"Komm zurück" (Come back) and "Die Banane" (The banana) are songs by German rock band Die Ärzte. "Komm zurück" is the eleventh and "Die Banane" the seventeenth track on their 2002 live album Unplugged: Rock'n'Roll Realschule. "Komm zurück/Die Banane" is the only single (a double single) from that album. 

"Komm zurück" was initially on Das ist nicht die ganze Wahrheit... and "Die Banane" on Planet Punk. "Komm zurück" was performed live for the first time ever for this record. "Komm zurück" is about missing someone. "Die Banane" is about how women eating bananas remind men of fellatio.

The videos for both songs feature footage from the concert.

Personnel
Bela B. - vocals
Farin Urlaub - background vocals
Rodrigo González - acoustic guitar

Track listing 
 "Komm zurück" – 3:29
 "Die Banane" – 4:59
 "Ist das alles?" – 4:12
 "Sommer, Palmen, Sonnenschein" – 2:42
 "3-Tage-Bart" – 3:24

B-sides 
The B-sides are live 'unplugged' recordings from the same concert as the A-sides not released on the album.

 "Ist das alles?" [Is that all?] is from Die Ärzte.
 "Sommer, Palmen, Sonnenschein" [Summer, palms, sunshine] was on Uns geht's prima... and on Die Ärzte früher!.
 "3-Tage-Bart" [Stubble] is from Le Frisur.

Charts

References

2002 singles
Die Ärzte songs
Songs written by Farin Urlaub
Songs written by Bela B.